Firminópolis is a municipality in eastern Goiás state, Brazil.

Location and connections
Distance to São Luís de Montes Belos:  9 km.

Highway connections with Goiânia are made by state highway BR-069 west from Goiânia, through Trindade, Santa Bárbara de Goiás, Turvânia, and then 19 kilometers west to Firminópolis.  Neighboring municipalities are Turvânia, Aurilândia, and Turvânia.

Demographic data
Population growth rate 2000/2007: 0.53%
Urban population in 2007: 8,212 
Rural population in 2007: 2,074

Economic data
The main economic activities were small transformation industries, goods and services, and agricultural production.  There were 02 banking institutions: Banco do Brasil S.A. - Banco Itaú S.A. (08/2007)  There was 01 dairy: Manoel Pereira Peixoto (05/2006).  The cattle herd had                 55,0000 head (2006) and the main crops were rice, corn, soybeans, manioc, hearts of palm, and bananas.

Education and health
Literacy rate: 84.1%
Infant mortality rate: 18.35 in 1,000 live births
Schools: 08 (2006)
Students: 2,382
Hospitals: 03 (2007) with 69 beds. 
MHDI:  0.744
State ranking:  91 (out of 242 municipalities in 2002)
National ranking:  2,039 (out of 5,507 municipalities in 2002)

For the complete list see frigoletto.com.br.

See also 
 List of municipalities in Goiás
Microregions of Goiás

References

Frigoletto
Distances to Goiânia

Municipalities in Goiás